HP Inc. is an American multinational information technology company headquartered in Palo Alto, California, United States.

Subsidiaries

See also 

 HP Inc.
 Lists of corporate assets

References 

Assets
Hewlett-Packard
Hewlett-Packard